This is a list of U.S. states and territories by economic growth rate. This article includes a list of the 50 U.S. states, the District of Columbia, and the 5 inhabited U.S. territories sorted by economic growth — the percentage change in real GDP for the first quarter of 2019 is listed (for the 50 states and District of Columbia), using the most recent data available from the U.S. Bureau of Economic Analysis. The most recent data for American Samoa, Guam, the Northern Mariana Islands, Puerto Rico, and the U.S. Virgin Islands is from 2018.

Within the 50 states and District of Columbia, West Virginia had the largest GDP growth rate ( 5.2%) in the First Quarter 2019, while Hawaii had the smallest growth rate ( 1.2%). In the 2018—2019 period, the Northern Mariana Islands had the lowest GDP growth rate ( 19.6%). In 2017, American Samoa had a very low GDP growth rate ( 5.8%), but its GDP has grown since then. Also, the Northern Mariana Islands had the highest GDP growth rate in the United States in 2017 ( 25.1%), but it now has the lowest GDP growth rate in the United States.


First Quarter 2019 list

2017−2019 list

2013 list

See also
List of U.S. state and territory economies

Notes

References

External links
 BEA news release: Widespread Economic Growth in 2012

Economy of the United States-related lists
Economic Growth Rate
United States States By Economic Growth Rate